Rajm (meaning stoning) in Islam refers to the Hudud punishment wherein an organized group throws stones at a convicted individual until that person dies. Under some versions of Islamic law (Sharia), it is the prescribed punishment in cases of adultery committed by a married person. The conviction requires a confession from either the adulterer/adulteress, or pregnancy outside of marriage under certain circumstances in Maliki school.

The punishment of stoning/Rajm or capital punishment for adultery is unique in Islamic law in that it conflicts with the Qur'anic prescription for premarital and extramarital sex (zina) found in Surah An-Nur, 2: "The woman and the man guilty of adultery or fornication — flog each of them with a hundred stripes." 
For this reason some minority Muslim sects such as Kharijites found in Iraq, and Islamic Modernists such as the Quranists disagree with the legality of rajm.

However, stoning is mentioned in multiple hadiths (reports claiming to quote what Muhammad said verbatim on various matters, which most Muslims and Islamic scholars consider an authoritative source second only to Quran as a source of religious law), and therefore most schools of Islamic jurisprudence accept it as a prescribed punishment for adultery. The punishment has been rarely applied in the history of Islam owing to the very strict evidential requirements stipulated by Islamic law.

Practice

Legal imposition of the rajm punishment was very rare in Islamic history. During the 623-year history of the Ottoman Empire, for which we have voluminous court records, there is only one recorded example of a judge sentencing a convict to death by stoning, and the ruling contravened Islamic law on at least two grounds (sufficient evidence was not produced, and a Jewish man was sentenced to death despite the law stating clearly that the death penalty for illegal sex should only be applied to Muslims). No sentences of stoning have been recorded in Syria during Muslim rule. Muslim jurists used a number of techniques to avoid application of the stoning penalty. They interpreted the evidentiary requirements so strictly that it was effectively impossible to prove the offense. They actively encouraged witnesses to withhold testimony, and argued that it was morally better to do so. They defined the offense narrowly to exclude many types of sexual activity. And they developed the legal concept of shubha (doubt), which held that when an illegal sexual act resembled legal sex in some way, the stoning penalty should not be applied. Techniques used to argue that the pregnancy of a single woman should not be considered evidence of zināʿ included fantastic presumptions about the length of the human gestation period. Classical Hanafite jurists ruled that it could last for up to two years, Shafi'ites four, and Malikites as long as five years.  Rashidun Caliph Umar once acquitted a pregnant single mother on the grounds that she was a "heavy sleeper" who had had "intercourse without realizing it".

According to journalist Max Rodenbeck,

In almost all cases where it has been applied in recent years, stoning has taken place in tribal or rebel areas beyond the control of central governments—the Taliban in Afghanistan, ISIS in Iraq, and Boko Haram in Nigeria being cases in point. Out of the world’s forty-nine Muslim-majority states, six retain the punishment in deference to Islamic legal tradition, ... Of these countries only Iran, which officially placed a moratorium on stoning in 2002 but still gives leeway to individual judges, has actually carried it out.

Saudi Arabia sentenced four people by stoning between the 1980 and 1992 but all were overturned because of lack of required evidence.
As of 2005, stoning punishments have been considered or handed down in Nigeria and Somalia for the crimes of adultery and sodomy (homosexuality) but all overturned. Since the Sharia legal system was introduced in northern Nigeria in 2000, more than a dozen Muslims have been sentenced to death by stoning but none have actually been stoned. In one case, an appellate court in the state of Sokoto overturned a stoning sentence on  the basis that divorced defendant might not have conceived her child in zina (fornication) because she may have been carrying her baby for as long as five years. Another Nigerian state court of appeal assessed the upper limit of gestation at seven years.

In Pakistan "more than three decades of official Islamization have so far failed to produce a single actual stoning..."   Iran officially placed a moratorium on stoning in 2002 but still gives leeway to individual judges to sentence rajm.  Sentences of stoning have generated heavy backlash by human rights groups, which considers stoning a form of execution by torture.

From July 2014 to February 2015, at least 15 people of whom nine were executed (not all by rajm) by Islamic State of Iraq and the Levant (ISIL) in Syria for the crimes of adultery or homosexuality, according to the Syrian Observatory for Human Rights.

Scriptural basis

Quran
Stoning is not mentioned as a form of capital punishment in the canonical text of the Quran. However, Islamic scholars have traditionally postulated that there is a Quranic verse ("If a man or a woman commits adultery, stone them...") which was "abrogated" textually while retaining its legal force.

Hadith 

Numerous Sahih (reliable, according to Sunni scholars) hadiths, however, describe stoning. One is the Hadith of Umar's speech of forbidding Mut'ah, Muhammad's last Hajj sermon and the Hadith of the Verse of Stoning.

The hadith Sahih Bukhari, the book most trusted after Quran by most Muslims, has several sunnah regarding stoning. For example,

Sahih Muslim Book 17 has several hadith regarding Stoning specifically (17:4191-4209, and 17:4914). For example,

Other hadiths also mention stoning as the punishment for adultery.

The early Islamic era text Musannaf of Abd al-Razzaq, in the chapter on Rajm, lists 70 hadith reports of stoning linked to Muhammad, and 100 to his companions and other authorities.

In jurisprudence (fiqh)
Rajm, sometimes spelled as Rajam, has been extensively discussed in the texts of early, medieval and modern era Islamic jurisprudence (fiqhs).

Persons who accuse a woman of adultery but are not able to bring four witnesses—a crime known as Qadhf, القذف—are liable to a punishment of 80 lashes and to be unacceptable as witnesses unless they repent and reform. The testimony of a man who accuses his own spouse without any other witnesses may be accepted if they swear by God four times that they are telling the truth with a fifth oath to incur God's condemnation if they be lying. In this case, if his spouse counterswears, no punishment will be enforced.
 
One of the widely followed Islamic legal commentaries, Al-Muwatta by Malik ibn Anas, state that contested pregnancy is sufficient proof of adultery and the woman must be stoned to death.

Hanafi
Hanafi jurists have held that the accused must be a muhsan at the time of religiously disallowed sex to be punished by Rajm (stoning). A Muhsan is an adult, free, Muslim who has previously enjoyed legitimate sexual relations in matrimony, regardless of whether the marriage still exists. In other words, stoning does not apply to someone who was never married in his or her life (only lashing in public is the mandatory punishment in such cases).

For evidence, Hanafi fiqh accepts the following: self-confession, or testimony of four male witnesses (female witnesses are not acceptable). Hanafi Islamic law literature specifies two types of stoning. One, when the punishment is based on bayyina, or concrete evidence (four male witnesses). In this case the person is bound, a pit dug, the bound person placed and partially buried inside the pit so that he or she may not escape, thereafter the public stoning punishment is executed. A woman sentenced to stoning must be partially buried up to her chest. The first stones are thrown by the witnesses and the accuser, thereafter the Muslim community present, stated Abū Ḥanīfa and other Hanafi scholars. In second type of stoning, when the punishment is based on self-confession, the stoning is to be performed without digging a pit or partially burying the person. In this case, the qadi (judge) should throw the first stone before other Muslims join in. Further, if the person flees, the person is allowed to leave.

Hanafi scholars specify the stone size to be used for Rajm, to be the size of one's hand. It should not be too large to cause death too quickly, nor too small to extend only pain.

Hanafites have traditionally held that the witnesses should throw the first stones in case the conviction was brought about by witnesses, and the qadi must throw the first stones in case the conviction was brought about by a confession.

Shafi'i
The Shafii school literature has the same Islamic law analysis as the Hanafi. However, it recommends, that the first stone be thrown by the Imam or his deputy in all cases, followed by the Muslim community witnessing the stoning punishment.

Hanbali
Hanbali jurist Ibn Qudamah states, "Muslim jurists are unanimous on the fact that stoning to death is a specified punishment for the married adulterer and adulteress. The punishment is recorded in number of traditions and the practice of Muhammad stands as an authentic source supporting it. This is the view held by all Companions, Successors and other Muslim scholars with the exception of Kharijites."

Hanbali Islamic law sentences all forms of consensual but religiously illegal sex as punishable with Rajm. However, Hanabali scholars insist that homosexuality among men must be punished by beheading, instead of Rajm as recommended by the Maliki madhab of Islam.

Maliki
Maliki school of jurisprudence (fiqh) holds that stoning is the required punishment for illegal sex by a married or widowed person, as well as for any form of homosexual relations among men. Malik ibn Anas, founded of Maliki fiqh, considered pregnancy in an unmarried woman as a conclusive proof of zina. He also stated that contested pregnancy is also sufficient proof of adultery and any Muslim woman who is pregnant by a man who she is not married to, at the time of getting pregnant, must be stoned to death. Later Maliki Muslim scholars admitted the concept of "sleeping embryo", where a divorced woman could escape the stoning punishment, if she remained unmarried and became pregnant anytime within five years of her divorce, and it was assumed that she was impregnated by her previous husband but the embryo remained dormant for five years.

Others
All Sunni schools of fiqh, as well as Volume 7 of the Shi'ite hadith, The Book of Legal Penalties in Kitab al-Kafi, declare stoning as the required punishment for sex that is not allowed under Sharia.

In contrast to Sunni schools, Shi'i fiqh, in Rajm cases, allows some of the witnesses to be women but considers the witness of a woman as half as valid as a man's. Thus, before an accused is sentenced to Rajm in the Shi'i system, the witnesses may be four men, three men and two women, two men and four women, one man and six women, but witnesses must include at least one man.  Furthermore, Shi'i jurists grant discretionary powers to the judge in cases of homosexuality, to sentence the accused to death by sword, Rajm (death by stoning), death by throwing from a high wall, or burning the accused to death.

Views
There is disagreement among modern Islamic thinkers as to the applicability of stoning for adultery.  While religious texts often give examples both with and without stoning, the Quran does not prescribe stoning as a punishment for any crime, mentioning only lashing as punishment for adultery. However most scholars maintain that there is sufficient evidence from hadiths to derive a ruling. The vast majority of Muslims consider hadiths, which describe the words, conduct and example set by Muhammad during his life, as a source of law and religious authority second only to the Quran. They consider sahih hadiths to be a valid source of Sharia, justifying their belief on Quranic verse 33.21, and other verses.

The reliability of Hadith is disputed by Quranist Muslims who reject all Hadith, and as a consequence the Rajm punishment as well.

Enayatullah Asad Subhani argues that Rajm is not the punishment of the fornication, as generally been understood, and it is not among the Hudood either.  His book Haqeeqat-e-Rajm was widely criticized by the ulama as he had tried to clear doubts against the punishments prescribed by Islam for different crimes. 
The islamic modernist Javed Ahmad Ghamidi postulates that Quranic verses prescribe Rajm only for those who habitually commit fornication as prostitutes do, which then constitute "mischief in the land" that is punishable by death according to Quranic verses 5:33-34. This view is not popular and does not enjoy acceptance by most ulema.

See also
Repentance in Islam
Sharia
Hirabah
Stoning
Stoning of the Devil
The Stoning of Soraya M. (Soraya Manutchehri)

References

External links

Opposing rajm, Ibrahim B. Syed
Stoning to death does not appear in the Qur’an
Stoning to Death
Punishment of Rajam
Stoning to Death:  A Violation of the Qur'an

Islam-related controversies
Islamic criminal jurisprudence
Islam and violence
Islam and capital punishment
Islamic terminology
Deaths by stoning